Aquí y Ahora (Here and Now) is a Spanish-language newsmagazine that is broadcast on the Univision television network in the United States on Sundays at 7:00 pm ET/ 6:00 CT.  The show was launched in 1998 and is presented by Ilia Calderón. Aquí y Ahora presents stories that document the Latino experience in the United States.  The program's memorable stories are compelling, surprising and revealing while providing context, perspective and balance.  A team of dedicated and experienced story tellers will take you places where news is breaking, and also bring human-interest dramas, mystery and in-depth investigations. In 2012, the show achieved national attention as it aired an investigation on the Fast and Furious scandal, for which it later received a Peabody Award.

Broadcast history
The show aired originally as a quarterly special edition and began weekly broadcasts on March 30, 2000, with Teresa Rodríguez, and María Elena Salinas and Jorge Ramos as co-anchors. It originally aired on Thursdays at 10:00 PM Eastern Time and Pacific Time/9:00 PM Central Time. In 2009 or 2010, the timeslot changed to Tuesdays at 10:00 PM Eastern and Pacific Time/9:00 PM Central Time. In 2012, Univision announced the show would air on Sundays at 7:00 PM Eastern and Pacific Time/6:00 PM Central Time.

Special editions

Rápido y Furioso: Armando al enemigo
In-depth investigation on failed Operation Fast and Furious that revealed how the guns that crossed the border as part of a government undercover operation, caused dozens of deaths in Mexico.

El Chapo Guzmán, el eterno fugitivo
Recounts the story of one of the world’s most wanted fugitives Joaquín "El Chapo" Guzmán at the juncture of his latest capture by the Mexican authorities in February 2014. The special set a record breaking weekly performance with over 1.6 million viewers.

Journalism awards
2005 GLAAD Award, Mejor Segmento Televisivo de Revista periodística en Español, Muxes
2007 NAHJ, National Association of Hispanic Journalists Award
2008 GLAAD Award, Mejor Segmento Televisivo de Revista periodística en Español, La historia de Angie Zapata
2013 Peabody Award, Operation fast and Furious (Univision Investiga)
2013 The Gracie Awards – Alliance for Women in Media, TV Outstanding Magazine, The Woman in the Mirror
2013 GLAAD Award, Mejor Segmento Televisivo de Revista periodística en Español, La vida en rosa
2014 GLAAD Award, Mejor Segmento Televisivo de Revista periodística en Español, Rompiendo Estereotipos
2015 GLAAD Award, Mejor Segmento Televisivo de Revista periodística en Español, En Cuerpo Ajeno
2014 Emmy Award Outstanding Coverage of a Breaking News Story in Spanish, La Masacre de Iguala
2014 Emmy Award Outstanding Investigative Journalism in Spanish, Los Nuevos Narcotesoros (Univision Investiga)
2015 Emmy Award Outstanding Investigative Journalism in Spanish, El Chapo: El Eterno Fugitivo
2017 Emmy Award Outstanding Coverage of a Breaking News Story in Spanish, La Recaptura de El Chapo
2018 Emmy Award Outstanding News Magazine in Spanish, En la boca del Lobo
2018 Emmy Award Outstanding Coverage of a Breaking News Story in Spanish, Terror en Las Vegas

References

External links
Aquí y Ahora official site

1990s American television news shows
2000s American television news shows
2010s American television news shows
1998 American television series debuts
 
Spanish-language television programming in the United States
Univision original programming